Gary Gibson (born May 5, 1982) is a former American football defensive tackle. He was signed by the Baltimore Ravens as an undrafted free agent in 2005. He played college football at Rutgers.

Gibson also played for the Hamburg Sea Devils, Carolina Panthers and St. Louis Rams.

College career
Gibson played in 44 games with 32 starts at Rutgers and totaled 114 tackles, 6.0 sacks, two forced fumbles and two fumble recoveries, He played in 10 games with eight starts as a senior and produced 25 tackles with 2.5 sacks. He was named co-winner of team’s Most Improved Player Award as a junior and started all 12 games that season and recorded a career-high 44 tackles. He started all 12 games as a sophomore and tallied 32 tackles. Gibson appeared in 10 games as a freshman. He red shirted as a true freshman in 2000.

Professional career

Baltimore Ravens
Gibson signed as an undrafted rookie free agent by Baltimore on April 29, 2005 and was placed on the reserve/injured list on August 30, 2005.

Carolina Panthers
He then signed as a free agent by Carolina in June, 2007, and was signed to the practice squad by Carolina in August and then was signed to the active roster on November 7, 2007 and recorded a tackle. Gibson re-signed as an unrestricted free agent by Carolina March 5, 2008. That season Gibson played 11 games and recorded nine tackles for the Panthers.

St. Louis Rams

Signed as a free agent by the St. Louis Rams April 20, 2009. He was a starter for three Rams preseason games in 2009 and is on the active roster. He was also the starter at left defensive tackle for the first five games of 2009, until a knee injury put him on the injured reserve for the rest of the 2009 NFL Season.

Tampa Bay Buccaneers
Gibson signed with the Tampa Bay Buccaneers on May 3, 2012.

References

External links

Tampa Bay Buccaneers bio
St. Louis Rams bio

1982 births
Living people
Players of American football from Syracuse, New York
American football defensive tackles
American football defensive ends
Rutgers Scarlet Knights football players
Baltimore Ravens players
Hamburg Sea Devils players
Carolina Panthers players
St. Louis Rams players
Tampa Bay Buccaneers players
People from Plant City, Florida